The Quaid e Awam University of Engineering, Sciences & Technology often referred as 'QUEST' is a public technical and research university located in the urban neighborhood of Nawabshah, Sindh, Pakistan. 

It is one of the best universities in Pakistan, ranks 7th best university among engineering universities in Pakistan.  The university is named after the former Prime Minister of Pakistan, Zulfikar Ali Bhutto (Quaid-e_Awam).

Recognized university
This university is recognized by the Higher Education Commission of Pakistan.

Academic Departments
The following:
Department of Artificial Intelligence
Department of  Automation and Control Engineering
Department of Agro-Food Processing Engineering Technology
Department of Basic Sciences And Related Studies
Department of Chemical Engineering
Department of Civil Engineering
Department of Computer Science
Department of Computer Systems Engineering
 Department of Electrical Engineering
Department of Electronic Engineering
 Department of Energy & Environmental Engineering
Department of Energy systems Engineering
Department of Environmental Engineering
Department of English (Language and Literature)
 Department of Information Technology
 Department of Mathematics And Statistics
Department of Mechanical Engineering
Department of Physics
Department of Software Engineering
 Department of Telecommunication Engineering

Academics

Undergraduate programs 
The system of education is the semester wise system. The academic year is divided into two semesters. University offers four-year (Eight Semesters) Bachelor's degree in Engineering, Information Technology, Computer Science, English and Mathematics.

Bachelor's degree program is offered by the following departments of university:
 Department of Artificial Intelligence
Department of  Automation and Control Engineering
Department of Agro-Food Processing Engineering Technology
Department of Chemical Engineering
Department of Civil Engineering
Department of Computer Science
Department of Computer Systems Engineering
 Department of Electrical Engineering
Department of Electronic Engineering
Department of Energy & Environment Engineering
Department of English (Language and Literature)
 Department of Information Technology
 Department of Mathematics And Statistics
Department of Mechanical Engineering
Department of Physics
Department of Software Engineering
 Department of Telecommunication Engineering

Postgraduate program
The new department situated at the front of Administration Block is Post Graduate Department, where various departments of university offer MS, M.Phil and Ph.D degree programs in following areas of research:

Master of Engineering (ME)

Construction Engineering
Civil Engineering
Structural Engineering
Power Engineering
Computer System Engineering
Computer Communication and Networks
Manufacturing Engineering
Industrial Engineering & Management
 Energy Systems Engineering
 Environmental Engineering
Communication Engineering 
Industrial Automation and control

Master of Science (MS)

Information Technology 
Software Engineering
Mathematics
Computer Science

Facilities

Q.U.E.S.T Software House, A-Sector
The Chairman of Department of Information Technology (Prof. Dr. Zahid Hussain Abro) recently open a Software House to develop software for University and commercial market of Pakistan.

Labs
All departments have their own laboratories with equipment and facilities for each subject. Especially Departments of Computer Systems, Information Technology, Computer Science have latest infrastructure and technical staff .

Student's Societies
The university support different international and national student societies . These Societies organize seminars about advancements in the technologies, different competitions and debates. The university also provides financial support to these societies to organize such events.

Sports
The university's offers a comprehensive range of facilities for sport and leisure for almost every student sport and participation at all levels. Student common rooms are annexed to every hostel in which facilities are provided for indoor games such as Table Tennis, Badminton, Carom, etc. Facilities exist for outdoor games such as Volleyball, Cricket, Tennis, Hockey, Basketball, Football, Athletics and Bodybuilding. For all these games a sports complex held near the Sector - C Mosque.

Scholarships
The university provides some of the following scholarship opportunities to its brighter and needy students.

 HEC–JAPANESE NEED BASED MERIT SCHOLARSHIP
 IEP-SAC SAUDI ARABIA SCHOLARSHIP
 MORA SCHOLARSHIP
 MERIT SCHOLARSHIP
 Quaid-e-Azam Scholarship (mr)
 Merit Scholarships
 Foreign Funded Scholarship Programs
OGDCL* Scholarship

See also

 List of Universities in Pakistan
 Mehran University of Engineering and Technology
 NED University of Engineering & Technology
 Sindh Agriculture University
 University of Sindh
 Higher Education Commission

References

External links
 Q.U.E.S.T official website

 Uni-Index
 Cultural Days of Q.U.E.S.T on You Tube

Engineering universities and colleges in Pakistan
Public universities and colleges in Sindh
Memorials to Zulfikar Ali Bhutto